Claviger is a genus of beetles in the family Staphylinidae, subfamily Pselaphinae. About 40 species and subspecies are described, divided into two subgenera, Claviger (Claviger) and Claviger (Clavifer). Claviger displays unusual biological adaptations to myrmecophily. This pselaphid is of palearctic distribution.

Species
Species list:

 Claviger (Clavifer) apenninus Baudi di Selve, 1869
 Claviger araxidis Reitter, 1890
 Claviger barbarus Bedel, 1884
 Claviger bartoni Mařan, 1936

 Claviger caspicus Reitter, 1882
 Claviger ciscaucasicus Reitter, 1910

 Claviger colchicus Motschulsky, 1837

 Claviger duvali Saulcy, 1863
 Claviger (Clavifer) elysius Reitter, 1884
 Claviger emgei Reitter, 1885

 Claviger guilloti Peyerimhoff, 1915
 Claviger (Clavifer) handmanni Wasmann, 1898
 Claviger ibericus Motschulsky, 1844
 Claviger intermedius Besuchet, 1961
 Claviger justinae Reitter, 1887
 Claviger katharinae Escherich, 1897

 Claviger lederi Reitter, 1877

 Claviger (Clavifer) longicornis P.W.J. Müller, 1818

 Claviger (Clavifer) merkli Reitter, 1885
 Claviger montandoni Raffray, 1905
 Claviger nebrodensis Ragusa, 1871
 Claviger nitidus Hampe, 1863
 Claviger oertzeni Reitter, 1885
 Claviger olympicus Escherich, 1897
 Claviger ottomanus Escherich, 1897

 Claviger piochardi Saulcy, 1874
 Claviger piochardi brucki Saulcy 1874
 Claviger piochardi piochardi Saulcy, 1874
 Claviger pouzaui Saulcy, 1862
 Claviger pouzaui cobosi Mateu, 1954
 Claviger pouzaui pouzaui Saulcy, 1862
 Claviger pouzaui validus Besuchet, 1961
 Claviger pyrenaeus Raffray, 1887
 Claviger raffrayi Reitter, 1893
 Claviger (Clavifer) revelierei Saulcy, 1874
 Claviger saulcyi Brissout de Barneville, 1866
 Claviger saulcyi espanoli Mateu, 1954
 Claviger saulcyi lucens Besuchet, 1961
 Claviger saulcyi saulcyi Brissout de Barneville, 1866

 Claviger (Claviger) testaceus Preyssler, 1790
 Claviger testaceus persicus B. Bodemeyer, 1927
 Claviger testaceus testaceus Preyssler, 1790
 Claviger testaceus perezii Reitter, 1881

See also
 Lasius claviger, a variety of ant

References

Pselaphinae genera